"Good Morning Starshine" is a pop song from the musical Hair (1967).  It was a No. 3 hit in the United States in July 1969 and a No. 6 hit in the United Kingdom in October 1969 for the singer Oliver.

The chorus makes extensive use of apparent nonsense words: "Glibby gloop gloopy, Nibby Nabby Noopy, La La La Lo Lo. Sabba Sibby Sabba, Nooby abba Nabba Le Le Lo Lo. Tooby ooby walla, nooby abba nabba, Early mornin' singin' song."

History
"Good Morning Starshine" is a song from the second act of the musical Hair (1967). The song is performed by the character Sheila, played Off-Broadway in 1967 by Jill O'Hara and by Lynn Kellogg in the original 1968 Broadway production. In the 1979 film version of the musical, Sheila is portrayed by Beverly D'Angelo.

Chart performance

Weekly charts

Year-end charts

Versions

Artists who have recorded the song
Andy Williams with the Osmond Brothers, Get Together with Andy Williams (1969)
Eddie Hazelton (better known as Eddie Rambeau), Dynovoice DY-917 (1968)
Gary Lewis and the Playboys, Rhythm of the Rain (1969)
Strawberry Alarm Clock, Good Morning Starshine (1969)
Chris Clark, CC Rides Again (1969)
Mort Garson, Electronic Hair Pieces (1969) (instrumental) 
Björn Skifs (1969, as "God morgon stjärnljus") scoring a Svensktoppen hit for two weeks.
Sahlee Quizon, daughter of Dolphy and Engracia (Gracia) Dominguez, under Vicor Records (1970)
Hugo Montenegro, Colours of Love  (1970)
Roger Whittaker, The Last Farewell (1971)
Lars Lönndahl (1971, as "God morgon stjärnljus") scoring a 1972 Svensktoppen hit for two weeks.
Elaine Paige, Stages (1983)
Sarah Brightman, As I Came of Age (1990)
Sharon, Lois & Bram, Let's Dance! (1995)
Anna-Lotta Larsson (2004, as "God morgon stjärnljus")
Serena Ryder, If Your Memory Serves You Well (2006)
Tartaglia Good Morning Starshine (instrumental) (1969)

Artists who have performed/recorded the song live
Diana Ross and The Supremes on The Hollywood Palace (1969)
Bob McGrath as Bob Johnson with Jim Henson's Muppets  on Sesame Street (1969)
Danielle White, on American Juniors (2007)

Appearances in other media

Bob McGrath as his character Bob Johnson with some Muppets performed the song on Sesame Street on Episode #3, broadcast November 12, 1969.
An instrumental version was used as the theme to WEWS' The Alan Douglas Morning Exchange and The Morning Exchange from 1972 until the mid-1980s.
In 1977, the cast performed the song on an episode of The Brady Bunch Variety Hour.
In the television sitcom Family Ties, Steven Keaton (Michael Gross) sings some lyrics from the song through his puppets, "Fluffy" and "Marv" in the episode, "It's My Party, Part 2", which originally aired on August 13, 1987.
The Capitol Steps comedy group did a song parody, "Good Morning Starbucks".
In The Ren & Stimpy Show episode "Superstitious Stimpy" (1995), Stimpy uses the lyrics as an incantation to ward off evil on Tuesday the 17th.
In a 1996 episode of Wings, called "Life Could Be a Dream," Joe sings a couple lyrics during a fantasy sequence.
In the movie A Very Brady Sequel (1996), the villain, Trevor Thomas (played by Tim Matheson) (who posed as Roy Martin, Carol's first husband), ate psychoactive mushrooms in spaghetti that Alice cooked for him, and he daydreamed being in another world with this song.
In the Absolutely Fabulous episode "The Last Shout" (1996), the main character, Edina Monsoon, imagines this song being sung by dancing hippies.
In The Simpsons episode "The Springfield Files" (1997), the townspeople, Leonard Nimoy, Chewbacca, Dana Scully, and Fox Mulder all sing "Good Morning Starshine".
Burger King used the song in an advertisement in the late 1990s.
In the movie The Dish (2000), the song was background music for the Thursday morning July 17, 1969 scene.
The song is featured in the ending of Maelström (2000) by Canadian director Denis Villeneuve.
Lyrics from the song are sung in The Simpsons episode "Simpson Safari" (2001).
In the movie Connie and Carla (2004), when the bar reopens as a dinner theater, Connie (Nia Vardalos) says the guys should enter from the back of the house on "Good Morning, Starshine".  They enter, singing the opening verse of the song. (This does not appear in the soundtrack of the film that was released, however.)
In the movie Charlie and the Chocolate Factory (2005), the character Willy Wonka welcomed the children with lyrics from "Good Morning Starshine".

References

External links
 

1967 songs
1969 debut singles
Song recordings produced by Bob Crewe
Oliver (singer) songs
Songs from Hair (musical)
RPM Top Singles number-one singles
Björn Skifs songs
Jubilee Records singles